Turkey took part in the Eurovision Song Contest 1998. The country was represented by Tüzmen with the song "Unutamazsın", written by Canan Tunç and composed by Erdinç Tunç.

Before Eurovision

21. Eurovision Şarkı Yarışması Türkiye Finali 
67 songs were submitted to TRT and 10 were selected for the national final.

The final took place on 28 February 1998 at the TRT Studios in Ankara, hosted by Bülend Özveren and Ekin Olcayto. Ten songs competed and the winner was determined by an expert jury. One of the contestants, Şebnem Paker and her group, had performed in Eurovision Song Contest 1997 and had received the highest points for Turkey up to 1997, but in 1998 they couldn't repeat their previous success.

At Eurovision
Heading into the final of the contest, BBC reported that bookmakers ranked the entry joint 25th (last) out of the 25 entries. On the night of the contest Tüzmen performed 24th in the running order, following Estonia and preceding Macedonia. At the close of the voting, Unutamazsın had received 25 points, placing Turkey 14th out of 25 contestants. Only five participants had voted for Unutamazsın. The Turkish jury awarded its 12 points to the United Kingdom.

Voting

References

1998
Countries in the Eurovision Song Contest 1998
Eurovision